William "Jack" Frank Horner (September 21, 1863 – July 14, 1910) was an American professional baseball player who played in two games for the Baltimore Orioles during the  season.
He was born in Baltimore, Maryland and died in New Orleans, Louisiana at the age of 46.

External links

1863 births
1910 deaths
Major League Baseball pitchers
Baseball players from Baltimore
Baltimore Orioles (AA) players
19th-century baseball players
Fort Wayne Hoosiers players
Ironton (minor league baseball) players
Toronto (minor league baseball) players
Trenton Trentonians players
Rochester Maroons players
Oswego Starchboxes players
Hamilton Hams players
Milwaukee Brewers (minor league) players
Milwaukee Creams players
Omaha Omahogs players
Omaha Lambs players
New Haven (minor league baseball) players
New Haven Nutmegs players
Oakland Colonels players
Petersburg Farmers players
Springfield Ponies players
Springfield Maroons players
Atlanta Crackers players
Bangor Millionaires players
Pawtucket Phenoms players
Scranton Miners players
Taunton Herrings players
Pawtucket Tigers players